JMX may refer to:

 Air Jamaica Express
 Java Management Extensions
 Silacayoapan Mixtec
 The British YouTuber JMX (Joel Morris)